The 82nd (West African) Division was formed under British control during the Second World War.  It took part in the later stages of the Burma Campaign and was disbanded in Burma between May and September 1946.

History

Formation
The inspiration for the division's formation came from General George Giffard. He had extensive experience of leading East African troops, and early in the Second World War became the commander of Britain's West Africa Command. He was eager for troops from Britain's African colonies to play their part in the war. When he was subsequently appointed to command India Command's Eastern Army, facing the Japanese army on the frontier between India and Burma, he requested that the two divisions being organised in West Africa be used in the Burma campaign.

The division was formed from the existing 1st (West African) Infantry Brigade and 2nd (West African) Infantry Brigade, both of which had previously taken part in the East African Campaign in 1940 and 1941, and the freshly raised 4th (Nigerian) Infantry Brigade. The Division's headquarters was created on 1 August 1943. It followed the 81st (West African) Division in the numbering sequence of British war-raised infantry divisions. The HQ took control of its sub-units on 1 November 1943.

The division's formation sign was crossed spears on a porter's headband, in black (sometimes white) on a yellow shield.

Burma campaign
On 20 May 1944, the division sailed for Ceylon, where the complete division was assembled on 20 July. In August the organisation was slightly changed, with supporting arms which had previously been distributed between the brigades being controlled centrally by the division HQ. The division was organised on a "head load" basis, with porters carrying all heavy equipment and supplies. Although many of the troops were from the savannah of northern Ghana and Nigeria, they were well-trained and effective when operating in jungle and mountains.

After further training, the division took part in the third Arakan campaign in December 1944 under Indian XV Corps. On 15 December the Division captured Buthidaung on the Kalapanzin River and created a bridgehead on the east bank of the river. This allowed allied troops to control the Maungdaw-Buthidaung road which had been contested for three years and enabled the transport of 650 river craft by road through railway tunnels to Buthidaung to supply Indian troops in the Mayu Range.

The 82nd Division (supported by 28th Anti-tank Regiment IA and 33rd Mountain Artillery Regiment IA) then crossed a steep and jungle-covered mountain range to converge with the British 81st (West African) Division on Myohaung near the mouth of the Kaladan River. This move forced the Japanese to evacuate the Mayu peninsula which they had held for almost four years and retreat south along the coast. As they retreated, British commandos from the 3rd Commando Brigade and units of the Indian 25th Infantry Division landed in inlets and chaungs ahead of them. Caught between the troops landing from the sea and the pursuing 82nd African Division, the Japanese suffered heavy casualties.

At this point, air supply was withdrawn from the Arakan front to allow the transport aircraft to supply the Allied forces in Central Burma. The 82nd Division's carrier battalions carried all supplies and equipment for the division from this point.

The Japanese 54th Division holding the Arakan was divided into two detachments holding the roads across the Arakan Hills leading from An and Taungup. The 82nd Division was asked to cross the Dalet Chaung and hilly terrain to approach the An Pass from the north west, while being supplied by air. The 1st and 4th (Nigerian) Brigades suffered heavy casualties in opening the routes to Kaw and Kyweguseik in late February. The 4th Brigade even lost two of its commanding officers. By March, the division captured Dalet Chaung and the strategic supply base of Tamandu, in coordination with Indian units.

The Gold Coast 2nd Brigade based at Letmauk subsequently became the target of intense Japanese counter-attacks, sustaining heavy casualties. They were forced to withdraw, covered by the 1st (Nigerian) Brigade. By sending long distance fighting patrols to harass the Japanese flanks, the Nigerian unit was able to force a Japanese retreat and retake An on 13 May 1945. Meanwhile, the main body of the division, with the East African 22nd Brigade under command, advanced south from Tamandu. By the end of May Kindaungyyi, Taungup and Sandoway had been captured. Campaigning ceased during the monsoon rains but the war ended a few weeks later.

Memorials
During the third Arakan campaign, the 82nd Division suffered 2,085 casualties, the highest of any unit in XV Corps. Some of those killed were buried in jungle tracts, but many Nigerian graves remain in cemeteries at the Dalet Chaung near Tamandu and the Taukkyan War Cemetery. Others are remembered at the War Memorial in Rangoon.

Other commemorations of the division's (and its component formations') service are the names of Dodan, An, Myohaung, Arakan and Marda Barracks in Lagos; Letmauk Barracks in Ibadan; Dalet, Mogadishu, Colito and Kalapanzin Barracks in Kaduna; the Chindit Barracks in Zaria;Arakan Barracks in Accra; Myohaung Barracks in Takoradi;

Order of Battle
General Officer Commanding : Major General George McIlree Stanton Bruce (replaced due to illness by Major General Hugh Charles Stockwell 12 January 1945)

On formation
The division's brigades were originally organised as infantry brigade groups.

1st (West Africa) Infantry Brigade

1st Battalion, Nigeria Regiment
2nd Battalion, Nigeria Regiment
3rd Battalion, Nigeria Regiment
5th (West Africa) Auxiliary Group 
1st (West Africa) Light Battery, West African Artillery (WAA)
2x Troops 3.7 inch mountain guns
1 Troop 4 x 3 inch Mortars
1st (West Africa) Field Company, West African Engineers (WAE)
1st (West Africa) Field Ambulance, West African Army Medical Corps (WAAMC)
details West Africa Army Service Corps (WAASC)
1st (West Africa) Infantry Brigade Provost Section

2nd (West Africa) Infantry Brigade

1st Battalion, Gold Coast Regiment
2nd Battalion, Gold Coast Regiment
3rd Battalion, Gold Coast Regiment
6th (West Africa) Auxiliary Group, Gold Coast Regiment
2nd (West Africa) Light Battery, (WAA)
2x Troops 3.7 inch mountain guns
1 Troop 4 x 3 inch Mortars
2nd (West Africa) Field Company,(WAE)
2nd (West Africa) Field Ambulance, (WAAMC)
details (WAASC)
2nd (West Africa) Infantry Brigade Provost Section

4th (West Africa) Infantry Brigade
5th Battalion, Nigeria Regiment
9th Battalion, Nigeria Regiment
10th Battalion, Nigeria Regiment
2nd (West Africa) Auxiliary Group
4th (West Africa) Light Battery, (WAA)
2x Troops 3.7 inch mountain guns
1 Troop 4 x 3 inch Mortars
4th (West Africa) Field Company, (WAE)
4th (West Africa) Field Ambulance, (WAAMC)
details (WAASC)
4th (West Africa) Infantry Brigade Provost Section

Division Troops
Artillery
2nd Light Anti-Aircraft/Anti-Tank Regiment, (WAA) (joined 12 December 1943)
102nd Light Regiment (WWA) (formed 1 July 1944 from the 1st 2nd and 4th Light Batteries 3.7 inch guns)
1st 2nd and 4th Light Batteries
42nd Mortar Regiment, (WAA) (formed 1 August 1944, formed from the mortar troops of the 1st 2nd and 4th Light Batteries)
Reconnaissance
81st (West African) Division Regiment, West African Armoured Corps (reconnaissance)
Engineers
1st Field Company, (WAE) (from 1st (WA) Brigade 22 August 1944)
2nd Field Company, (WAE) (from 2nd (WA) Brigade 1 August 1944)
4th Field Company, (WAE) (from 4th (WA) Brigade 1 August 1944)
9th Field Park Company, (WAE)
Bearers
7th (West African) Auxiliary Group
Division Troops
81st (West African) Divisional Signals

On Reorganisation
in October 1944 the division was reorganised as a standard division, (not as brigade groups).

1st (West Africa) Infantry Brigade
1st Battalion, Nigeria Regiment
2nd Battalion, Nigeria Regiment
3rd Battalion, Nigeria Regiment
5th (West Africa) Auxiliary Group

2nd (West Africa) Infantry Brigade
1st Battalion, Gold Coast Regiment
2nd Battalion, Gold Coast Regiment
3rd Battalion, Gold Coast Regiment
6th (West Africa) Auxiliary Group, Gold Coast Regiment

4th (West Africa) Infantry Brigade
5th Battalion, Nigeria Regiment
9th Battalion, Nigeria Regiment
10th Battalion, Nigeria Regiment
2nd (West Africa) Auxiliary Group

Divisional Units
Artillery
102nd Light Regiment, (WAA)
1st, 2nd, 4th Light Batteries
42nd Mortar Regiment, (WAA)
22nd Anti-Tank Regiment, West African Artillery
Engineers
1st Field Company, West African Engineers
2nd Field Company, West African Engineers
4th Field Company, West African Engineers
9th Field Park Company, West African Engineers
Bearers
7th (West African) Auxiliary Group
Service Corps (WAASC)
82nd (West African) Infantry Division Transport Regiment
825th and 836th Divisional Transport Company, (WAASC)
1784th, 1785th, 1786th, 1787th Composite Platoons (WAASC)
26th and 29th Field Butchery Sections, (WAASC)
West African Army Medical Corps (WAAMC)
1st (West Africa) Field Ambulance, WAAMC
2nd (West Africa) Field Ambulance, WAAMC
4th (West Africa) Field Ambulance, WAAMC
82nd (West Africa) Field Hygiene Section, WAAMC
West African Electrical & Mechanical Engineers (WAEME)
1003rd, 1004th and 1005th Mobile Workshops, WAEME
1016th - 1022nd Light Aid Detachments, WAEME
Division Troops
81st (West African) Divisional Signals
82nd (West Africa) Divisional Postal Unit
119th Field Cash Office, West African Army Pay Corps
82nd Field Security Section
276th Divisional Provost Company

See also
Military history of Nigeria during World War II
81st (West African) Division

References

Bibliography

Notes

External links
 
 Burma Star organisation page
 Divisional Histories

British World War II divisions
Infantry divisions of the United Kingdom
Military units and formations established in 1943
Military units and formations disestablished in 1945
Military units and formations of the British Empire in World War II
D